Žostautai or Zaštautai (formerly) is a village in Kėdainiai district municipality, in Kaunas County, in central Lithuania. According to the 2011 census, the village had a population of 53 people. There is a farm.

History
Žostautai has been known since 1596. There was Žostautai village and folwark at the end of the 19th century. During the Soviet era it was a subsidiary kolkhoz settlement.

Demography

Images

References

Villages in Kaunas County
Kėdainiai District Municipality